Arnold House may refer to:

 in Britain
 Arnold House School, London
 Arnold House (Former school), Llanddulas, north Wales 
 Arnold House School, Chester 
 Arnold School, Blackpool

in the United States
(by state, then city)
 George Arnold House, Kenton, Delaware, listed on the National Register of Historic Places (NRHP)
 Willcoxon-Arnold House, Newnan, Georgia, listed on the NRHP in Coweta County, Georgia
 Thomas P. Arnold House, Palmetto, Georgia, listed on the NRHP in Fulton County, Georgia
Dr. John Arnold Farm, Rushville, Indiana, listed on the National Register of Historic Places (NRHP) in Rush County
 Dr. John Arnold Farm, Union Township, Indiana, listed on the NRHP in Rush County, Indiana
 Philip Arnold House, Elizabethtown, Kentucky, listed on the NRHP in Hardin County, Kentucky
John Arnold House (Paint Lick, Kentucky), listed on the NRHP in Garrard County
 Francis Arnold House, near St. Cloud, Minnesota, listed on the NRHP  in Stearns County, Minnesota
 Benjamin Walworth Arnold House and Carriage House, Albany, New York, NRHP-listed
 Arnold Homestead, Dayton, Ohio, NRHP-listed
 Arnold–Park Log Home, Portland, Oregon, NRHP-listed
 Eleazer Arnold House, Lincoln, Rhode Island, an NRHP-listed house and also a museum
 Israel Arnold House, Lincoln, Rhode Island, NRHP-listed
 Mitchell-Arnold House, Pawtucket, Rhode Island, NRHP-listed
 Arnold-Palmer House, Providence, Rhode Island, NRHP-listed
 John Waterman Arnold House, Warwick, Rhode Island, NRHP-listed
John Arnold House (Woonsocket, Rhode Island), listed on the NRHP
 Arnold-Harrell House, Murfreesboro, Tennessee, listed on the NRHP in Rutherford County, Tennessee
 Arnold-Torbet House, Georgetown, Texas, listed on the NRHP in Williamson County, Texas
 Russell-Arnold House, Lufkin, Texas, listed on the NRHP in Angelina County, Texas
 Arnold-Simonton House, Montgomery, Texas, listed on the NRHP in Montgomery County, Texas
 E. Clarke and Julia Arnold House, Columbus, Wisconsin, NRHP-listed
 Capt. Alexander A. Arnold Farm, Galesville, Wisconsin, NRHP-listed

See also
 John Arnold House (disambiguation)